Companilactobacillus kimchii is a bacteriocin-producing lactic acid bacterium of the genus Companilactobacillus. It is named for and found in the Korean fermented-vegetable food kimchi.

The cells of C. kimchii are short, slender and rod-shaped. The bacterium is Gram-positive, non-spore-forming and non-motile.

References

Further reading

Lactobacillaceae
Kimchi
Bacteria described in 2000